Kemmerer may refer to:

Places in the United States
 Kemmerer, Wyoming, a city
 Kemmerer High School, a high school in Kemmerer, Wyoming
 Kemmerer House, a historic home in Emmaus, Pennsylvania
 Kemmerer Hotel, a former historic hotel in Kemmerer, Wyoming
 Kemmerer Municipal Airport, an airport in Kemmerer, Wyoming

People
 Beatrice Kemmerer (1930–2013), American baseball player
 Brigid Kemmerer (born 1978), American author
 Connie Kemmerer, American businesswoman
 Ed Kemmer (1921–2014), born Edward Kemmerer, American actor
 Edwin W. Kemmerer (1875–1945), American economist
 Jay Kemmerer (born 1947), American businessman
 Lisa Kemmerer, American academic
 Russ Kemmerer (1930–2013), American baseball player

See also
 Kemerer (disambiguation)